(ANJV) was a political youth movement in the Netherlands. ANJV was founded on 15 June 1945, in Concert building, Amsterdam.

Contrary to popular belief, the ANJV was not the youth organisation of the CPN, but had an independent broad "all-youth" structure, similar to that of the East-German  (FDJ).

The ANJV was dissolved in 2005, after 60 years.

ANJV was a member of World Federation of Democratic Youth.

See also 
 Communist Youth Movement (Netherlands)

References 

Youth wings of communist parties
Youth wings of political parties in the Netherlands